Acacia colletioides, commonly known as wait-a-while, pin bush and spine bush, is a shrub of the genus Acacia and the subgenus Plurinerves that is native to Australia.

Description
The branchlets are glabrous to sparsely haired and have scarring where phyllodes have detached. The pungent, rigid, glabrous phyllodes are sessile and are found on distinct, yellow stem-projections. It blooms in winter and spring from July to September and produces yellow flowers. Two simple inflorescences are found per axil, the flower heads have a subglobular to ellipsoidal shape and contain 15 to 24 flowers.

Taxonomy
The species was first formally described by the botanist George Bentham in 1842 as part of William Jackson Hookers work Notes on Mimoseae, with a synopsis of species as published in the London Journal of Botany. It was reclassified as Racosperma colletioides by Leslie Pedley in 2003 then transferred back to genus Acacia in 2006.
A. colletioides is closely related to Acacia nyssophylla. It is similar in appearance to Acacia asepala, Acacia subsessilis and Acacia enterocarpa.

Distribution
It is found in dry areas from around Geraldton on the west coast of Western Australia, through part of South Australia and north western Victoria to around Dubbo in New South Wales, where it is mostly a part of mallee scrub or open woodland communities.
In Western Australia it is native to an area in the Wheatbelt, Mid West and Goldfields-Esperance regions where it grows in a variety of soil types.
In Victoria it is found in the Murray mallee, the Lowan mallee, the Murray scroll belt and the Robinvale Plains bioregions where it is found in the north-west mostly as a part of mallee scrub or open woodland communities growing in sandy loam soils.

See also
List of Acacia species

References

colletioides
Acacias of Western Australia
Plants described in 1842
Taxa named by George Bentham
Flora of South Australia
Flora of New South Wales
Flora of Victoria (Australia)